The Surface Go is a  2-in-1 detachable in the Microsoft Surface series that was released on August 2, 2018. It was unveiled by Microsoft on July 10, 2018. This was the first generation of the Surface Go. In May 2020, this has been superseded by the Surface Go 2. 

The device runs Windows 10 Home in S-Mode and features a 5MP front facing camera, an infrared camera, 8 MP rear camera, a NFC chip and a kickstand supporting an angle of up to 165°. The screen is a 3:2 optically-bonded PixelSense 1800 x 1200 display with a density of 217 PPI and a full 180 degree viewing angle. The Surface Go starts at US$399 and does not include a Type Cover or Surface Pen, which must be purchased separately. The Type Cover is offered in black, plus three options with Alcantara fabric—Burgundy, Cobalt Blue, and Platinum. The Type Cover also uses an 8-pin connection instead of the 6-pin connection featured in past Surfaces, breaking compatibility with other models.

Configuration

Features

 Surface Go has an Intel Pentium Gold Processor 4415Y and Intel HD Graphics 615 GPU. Storage options are 64 GB, 128 GB, and 256 GB.
 Surface Go can fully charge its battery in 2 hours.
 Surface Go comes with a headphone jack, a USB-C port, and a micro SD card slot.
 All configurations are also available with Windows 10 Pro for an additional US$50.
 The 8.3 mm thick tablet weighs .
The Surface Go has either 4 GB or 8 GB of RAM

Hardware

The Surface Go is the 4th addition to small Surface lineup featuring a full-body magnesium alloy construction. The Surface Go is aimed toward kids, students and schools.

The device features a fanless Intel Pentium Gold processor inside.

For the first time, the device contains USB C port with power delivery, the first Surface device to support such port and a Surface Connect port. The front-facing camera contains an infrared sensor that supports login using Windows Hello.

The detachable keyboard, which is sold separately, uses an 8-pin connection which is compatible with the newer model.

Software 

Surface Go comes pre-installed with Windows 10 Home in S Mode and a 30-day trial of Office 365. With S Mode, users may only install software from Windows Store. S Mode of the OS can be upgraded to Windows 10 Home for free or Windows 10 Pro for a fee.

Windows 10 comes pre-installed with Mail, Calendar, People, Xbox, Photos, Movies and TV, Groove, Office and Edge. The device also supports Windows Hello login using a biometric facial recognition.

Timeline

References

External links 
 
  

Microsoft Surface
Tablet computers introduced in 2018
2-in-1 PCs